Evraiomnimata is a neighbourhood in the city of Patras, Achaea, Greece.

In the past, in the area, there was the cemetery of the Jewish community of the city.

Neighborhoods in Patras